Charles Forrest Curry Jr. (August 13, 1893 – October 7, 1972) was a U.S. Representative from California and the son of Charles Forrest Curry.

Born in San Francisco, California, Curry attended the public schools Howe's Academy in Sacramento, California as well as George Washington University and Georgetown University School of Law, Washington, D.C. He served as secretary to his father, Congressman Charles F. Curry from 1913 to 1917.

During the First World War, Curry Jr. enlisted in the Aviation Section, Signal Enlisted Reserve Corps, on August 15, 1917. There, he was commissioned a second lieutenant and served until May 22, 1919 with overseas service.

He served as a clerk to the Committee on the Territories of House of Representatives from 1919 to 1930. In 1921, he was admitted to the bar.

Curry was elected as a Republican as a write-in candidate to the Seventy-second Congress (March 4, 1931 – March 3, 1933) following the death of his father, who was on the ballot. As he was an unsuccessful candidate for reelection in 1932 to the Seventy-third Congress, he engaged in the practice of law and in mining and other business enterprises.

He resided in Long Beach, California, where he died on October 7, 1972.

He was interred in Westminster Memorial Park, Westminster, California.

References

1893 births
1972 deaths
Politicians from San Francisco
American people of Cornish descent
Republican Party members of the United States House of Representatives from California
20th-century American politicians
George Washington University alumni
Georgetown University Law Center alumni
United States Army officers
American military personnel of World War I